Rankine is the codename for a GPU microarchitecture developed by Nvidia, and released in 2003, as the successor to Kelvin microarchitecture. It was named with reference to Macquorn Rankine and used with the GeForce FX series.

Graphics features 
 DirectX 9.0a
 OpenGL 1.5 (2.1)
 Shader Model 2.0a
 Vertex Shader 2.0a
 Max VRAM size bumped to 256MB

Due to the lack of unified shaders you will not be able to run recent games at all (DirectX 10 mini).

Chips

GeForce FX series and GeForce FX (5xxx) series 
 NV39, 82 million transistor
 NV38, 135 million transistor
 NV37, 45 million transistor
 NV36, 82 million transistor
 NV35
 NV34
 NV31
 NV30, 125 million transistor

GPU list

GeForce 5 (5xxx) series

See also 
 List of eponyms of Nvidia GPU microarchitectures
 List of Nvidia graphics processing units
 Nvidia PureVideo
 Scalable Link Interface (SLI)
 Qualcomm Adreno

References

External links 

GPGPU
Nvidia Curie
Nvidia microarchitectures
Parallel computing
Graphics cards